The 1978 Giro d'Italia was the 61st edition of the Giro d'Italia, one of cycling's Grand Tours. The Giro began with a prologue individual time trial in Saint-Vincent on 7 May, and Stage 10 occurred on 17 May with a mountainous stage to Lago di Piediluco. The race finished in Milan on 28 May.

Prologue
7 May 1978 — Saint-Vincent,  (ITT)

Stage 1
8 May 1978 — Saint-Vincent to Novi Ligure,

Stage 2
9 May 1978 — Novi Ligure to La Spezia,

Stage 3
10 May 1978 — La Spezia to Càscina,

Stage 4
11 May 1978 — Larciano to Pistoia,  (ITT)

Stage 5
12 May 1978 — Prato to Cattolica,

Stage 6
13 May 1978 — Cattolica to Silvi Marina,

Stage 7
14 May 1978 — Silvi Marina to Benevento,

Stage 8
15 May 1978 — Benevento to Ravello,

Stage 9
16 May 1978 — Amalfi to Latina,

Stage 10
17 May 1978 — Latina to Lago di Piediluco,

References

1978 Giro d'Italia
Giro d'Italia stages